The Aerial Board of Control is a fictional supranational organization dedicated to the control and aid of airship traffic across the whole world. It was first described in the science fiction novella by Rudyard Kipling, "With the Night Mail: A Story of 2000 A.D." (The Windsor Magazine, December 1905; McClure's Magazine, November 1905). In 1909 it was issued as a popular book, slightly revised and with additional poetry and faux advertisements and notices from the future. It later appeared in the Kipling story collection Actions and reactions (1915).

The initial publication in McClure's stated "2025" as the supposed date of publication, but the various dates were later reworked and Kipling settled on the year 2000 A.D. By this date the Aerial Board of Control was established as an ad hoc working world organisation, much as the global arrangements of the General Post Office (G.P.O) already had in Kipling's time, and with the aim of keeping national entanglements to a minimum for commerce and communication. Kipling envisages the Board as having a tight structure and hierarchical organisation, akin to a blend of the British Merchant Navy and the Post Office, with its world centre in London.

Later the Board appeared in the long sequel story "As Easy as ABC" (The London Magazine 1912, written 1907), set in the year 2065 after a devastating plague. At this point the A.B.C. is effectively a reluctant and light-touch world government, though its mandate limits it to the protection of free trade and "all that may imply". Again, here Kipling took the opportunity to slightly revise elements of the earlier story.

Kipling wrote only these two science fiction stories set in his Aerial Board of Control universe of the early 21st century. To date, no other author or RPG gamer has followed his lead by creating more such tales, but the overall theme strongly anticipated the much later genre of steampunk, with touches of valvepunk in the radium-sourced method of airship propulsion. Kipling's two A.B.C. stories have also been held up as the first examples of the use in science fiction of force-fields, streamed data-recording to tape, and the immense pulsing 'cloud-breaker' navigation beams that guide the world's airships can be seen as anticipating the laser. Charles Carrington (Rudyard Kipling: His Life and Work, 1955) researched the radio technology of the time, and found that - even though there was then "no radio-telephony" - Kipling's story had envisioned complex air-traffic control by radio as... "a world-wide network of radio services, supplying weather forecasts, and allotting safety-levels, and landing priorities, thirty years before anyone else had dreamed of 'flying control'".

In terms of influence on other writers of the pre-war era the initial story pre-dates H.G. Wells' The War in the Air by three years, and presents a far more optimistic vision of the future. More generally the concept that air traffic would become widely used, and that some rational and impartial supra-national control of it would needed, is one that became a staple of pulp and 'scientifiction' as flight took wing in the 1930s. 

The two stories were widely anthologised in the 20th century, for instance opening the major Gollancz anthology One Hundred Years of Science Fiction (1969), and are now in the public domain.  The innovative approach of the "Night Mail" story, termed "indirect exposition", strongly influenced the style of the later post-war science-fiction author Robert A. Heinlein.

The corrected typescript of "With the Night Mail" was acquired at auction by the University of Sussex library in 1997. 

The tales inspired a substantial role-playing game, Forgotten Futures, which had as its first source book The A.B.C. Files: A Role Playing Sourcebook For Kipling's Scientific Romance (1998). This is currently free and has a technical glossary and timeline drawn from the stories.

References 

 , page 355.

Texts
With The Night Mail
As Easy as ABC
Illustrated PDF of both stories

Fictional elements introduced in 1905
Fictional military organizations
Fictional governments
Works by Rudyard Kipling
Bureaucracy in fiction
Air traffic control organizations